Bradycardia (also sinus bradycardia) is a slow resting heart rate, commonly under 60 beats per minute (BPM) as determined by an electrocardiogram. It is considered to be a normal heart rate during sleep, in young and healthy or elderly adults, and in athletes.

In some people, bradycardia below 60 BPM may be associated with fatigue, weakness, dizziness, sweating, and fainting. The term "relative bradycardia" is used to refer to a heart rate slower than an individual's typical resting heart rate. Athletes may have athletic heart syndrome, which includes bradycardia as part of the cardiovascular adaptations to training and participation.

The word "bradycardia" is from the Greek βραδύς bradys "slow", and καρδία kardia "heart".

Classification

Sinus
Atrial bradycardias are divided into three types. The first, respiratory sinus arrhythmia, is usually found in young and healthy adults. Heart rate increases during inhalation and decreases during exhalation.  This is thought to be caused by changes in the vagal tone during respiration.

Sinus bradycardia is a sinus rhythm of less than 60 BPM. It is a common condition found in both healthy individuals and those considered well-conditioned athletes. Studies have found that 50–85% of conditioned athletes have benign sinus bradycardia, as compared to 23% of the general population studied. The heart muscle of athletes has a higher stroke volume, so requires fewer contractions to circulate the same volume of blood.

The third, sick sinus syndrome, covers conditions that include severe sinus bradycardia, sinoatrial block, sinus arrest, and bradycardia-tachycardia syndrome (atrial fibrillation, atrial flutter, and paroxysmal supraventricular tachycardia).

Atrioventricular junction
An AV-junctional rhythm, or atrioventricular nodal bradycardia, is usually caused by the absence of the electrical impulse from the sinus node. This usually appears on an electrocardiogram (ECG) with a normal QRS complex accompanied with an inverted P wave either before, during, or after the QRS complex.

An AV-junctional escape beat is a delayed heartbeat originating from an ectopic focus somewhere in the AV junction. It occurs when the rate of depolarization of the SA node falls below the rate of the AV node. This dysrhythmia also may occur when the electrical impulses from the SA node fail to reach the AV node because of SA or AV block. This is a protective mechanism for the heart, to compensate for an SA node that is no longer handling the pacemaking activity and is one of a series of backup sites that can take over pacemaker function when the SA node fails to do so. This would present with a longer PR interval. An AV-junctional escape complex is a normal response that may result from excessive vagal tone on the SA node. Pathological causes include sinus bradycardia, sinus arrest, sinus exit block, or AV block.

Ventricular
Idioventricular rhythm, also known as atrioventricular bradycardia or ventricular escape rhythm, is a heart rate of less than 50 BPM. This is a safety mechanism when a lack of electrical impulse or stimuli from the atrium occurs. Impulses originating within or below the bundle of His in the AV node will produce a wide QRS complex with heart rates between 20 and 40 BPM. Those above the bundle of His, also known as junctional, will typically range between 40 and 60 BPM with a narrow QRS complex. In a third-degree heart block, about 61% take place at the bundle branch-Purkinje system, 21% at the AV node, and 15% at the bundle of His. AV block may be ruled out with an ECG indicating "a 1:1 relationship between P waves and QRS complexes." Ventricular bradycardias occurs with sinus bradycardia, sinus arrest, and AV block. Treatment often consists of the administration of atropine and cardiac pacing.

Infantile
For infants, bradycardia is defined as a heart rate less than 100 BPM (normal is around 120–160 BPM). Premature babies are more likely than full-term babies to have apnea and bradycardia spells; their cause is not clearly understood. The spells may be related to centers inside the brain that regulate breathing which may not be fully developed. Touching the baby gently or rocking the incubator slightly will almost always get the baby to start breathing again, which increases the heart rate. Medications (theophylline or caffeine) can be used to treat these spells in babies if necessary. Neonatal intensive-care unit (NICU) standard practice is to electronically monitor the heart and lungs for this reason.

Causes
Bradycardia arrhythmia may have many causes, both cardiac and non-cardiac.

Non-cardiac causes are usually secondary, and can involve recreational drug use or abuse, metabolic or endocrine issues, especially hypothyroidism, an electrolyte imbalance, neurological factors, autonomic reflexes, situational factors, such as prolonged bed rest, and autoimmunity.

Cardiac causes include acute or chronic ischemic heart disease, vascular heart disease, valvular heart disease, or degenerative primary electrical disease. Ultimately, the causes act by three mechanisms: depressed automaticity of the heart, conduction block, or escape pacemakers and rhythms.

In general, two types of problems result in bradycardias: disorders of the SA node, and disorders of the AV node.

With SA node dysfunction (sometimes called sick sinus syndrome), there may be disordered automaticity or impaired conduction of the impulse from the SA node into the surrounding atrial tissue (an "exit block"). Second-degree sinoatrial blocks can be detected only by use of a 12-lead ECG. It is difficult and sometimes impossible to assign a mechanism to any particular bradycardia, but the underlying mechanism is not clinically relevant to treatment, which is the same in both cases of sick sinus syndrome: a permanent pacemaker.

AV conduction disturbances (AV block; primary AV block, secondary type I AV block, secondary type II AV block, tertiary AV block) may result from impaired conduction in the AV node, or anywhere below it, such as in the bundle of His. The clinical relevance pertaining to AV blocks is greater than that of SA blocks.

Beta blocker medicines also can slow the heart rate and decrease how forcefully the heart contracts. Beta-blockers may slow the heart rate to a dangerous level if prescribed with calcium channel blocker-type medications. Bradycardia is also part of the mammalian diving reflex.

Diagnosis
A diagnosis of bradycardia in adults is based on a heart rate less than 60 BPM, although some studies use a heart rate of less than 50 BPM. This is determined usually either by palpation or ECG. If symptoms occur, a determination of electrolytes may be helpful in determining the underlying cause.

Management
The treatment of bradycardia is dependent on whether or not the person is stable or unstable.

Stable
Emergency treatment is not needed if the person is asymptomatic or minimally symptomatic.

Unstable
If a person is unstable, the initial recommended treatment is intravenous atropine. Doses less than 0.5 mg should not be used, as this may further decrease the rate. If this is not effective, intravenous inotrope infusion (dopamine, epinephrine) or transcutaneous pacing should be used. Transvenous pacing may be required if the cause of the bradycardia is not rapidly reversible.

In children, giving oxygen, supporting their breathing, and chest compressions are recommended.

Epidemiology

In clinical practice, elderly people over age 65 and young athletes of both sexes may have sinus bradycardia. The US Centers for Disease Control and Prevention reported in 2011 that 15.2% of adult males and 6.9% of adult females had clinically-defined bradycardia (a resting pulse rate below 60 BPM).

Society and culture

Records
 Daniel Green holds the world record for the slowest heartbeat in a healthy human, with a heart rate measured in 2014 of 26 BPM.
 Martin Brady holds the Guinness world record for the slowest heart rate with a certified rate over a minute duration of 27 BPM.
 Professional cyclist Miguel Indurain had, during his career, a resting heart rate of 28 BPM.

See also

References

External links

Cardiac arrhythmia
Symptoms and signs: Cardiac